White Rock  is the second soundtrack album by English keyboardist Rick Wakeman, released in January 1977 by A&M Records. It was produced as the soundtrack to White Rock, a 1977 documentary film about the 1976 Winter Olympics held in Innsbruck, Austria.

In 1999, Wakeman released a sequel soundtrack, White Rock II.

Recording
Wakeman had forgotten about a track he had been asked to compose, titled "After the Ball". Instead of confessing to the producers that he had forgot to write something, he said he had a composition ready and proceeded to play a completely improvised track. The first take was a success, without the need to record a second take. "After the Ball" has become part of Wakeman's repertoire, featured on several future albums and videos.

"Ice Run" uses parts of "Anne of Cleves", a track from Wakeman's first album, The Six Wives of Henry VIII (1973). The comparison can be made by listening to "Anne of Cleves" at 00:48 and "Ice Run" at 3:29.

Track listing
Side one
"White Rock" – 3:10
"Searching for Gold" – 4:20
"The Loser" – 5:30
"The Shoot" – 3:59

Side two
"Lax'x" – 4:53
"After the Ball" – 3:03
"Montezuma's Revenge" (traditional) – 3:56
"Ice Run" – 6:11

Personnel
Music
Rick Wakeman – Moog synthesiser, Steinway grand piano, Mellotron, Mander pipe organ, RMI Computer Piano, marimba, RMI Rock-Si-Chord, Hohner clavinet, Fender Rhodes piano, Hammond C3 organ, grand piano, 
St Paul's Cathedral Choir
Tony Fernandez – drums, percussion

Production
Rick Wakeman – production, arrangements
Paul Hardiman – mastering
Richard Lewzey – assistant on "After the Ball" and "Montezuma's Revenge"
Ken Thomas – tape operator

Charts

Certifications

References

Rick Wakeman albums
1977 albums